Achada Grande Tras is a subdivision of the city of Praia in the island of Santiago, Cape Verde. Its population was 2,958 at the 2010 census. It is situated east of the city centre, and south of the Nelson Mandela International Airport. Adjacent neighbourhoods include Achada Grande Frente and Lem Ferreira to the west.

Landmarks and points of interest
Complexo Desportivo Adega - center
Nelson Mandela International Airport, the city's and the island's airport - north
Praia Harbour

References

Subdivisions of Praia